Lady Eaton may refer to:

 Flora Eaton
 Margaret Eaton, Baroness Eaton